Hornet's Nest (1997) is a book by author Patricia Cornwell, set in Charlotte, North Carolina, which was called  "a hornet's nest of rebellion" by Cornwallis during the American Revolutionary War.

Plot summary
The author reveals the heart and soul of a metropolitan police department. With Charlotte as her simmering background, she propels us into the core of the force through the lives of a dynamic trio of heroes: Andy Brazil, an ambitious younger reporter for The Charlotte Observer and an eager - sometimes too eager - volunteer cop; Police Chief Judy Hammer, the professionally strong yet personally troubled guardian of Charlotte's law and order; and her deputy chief, Virginia West, a genuine head-turner who is married to her job. To walk the beat with Hammer, West, and Brazil is to learn the inner secrets of police work - the tension and the tedium, the hilarity and the heartbreak, the unexpected pump of adrenaline and the rush of courage that can lead to heroics ... or death.

Characters
Virginia West – 42-year-old Deputy Chief.
Judy Hammer – Chief of Police.
Andy Brazil – Journalist & Volunteer Cop.

Adaptation
The book was adapted as a made-for-TV movie that premiered Saturday, March 31, 2012 at 8 p.m. exclusively on TNT. The television film adaptation starred Virginia Madsen, Sherry Stringfield, Michael Boatman, Robbie Amell, Jane McNeill, and Quentin Kerr.

References

Novels by Patricia Cornwell
1997 American novels
Novels set in Charlotte, North Carolina
Novels set during the American Revolutionary War
American novels adapted into films
American novels adapted into television shows
G. P. Putnam's Sons books